The New Inn is a heritage-listed former inn and now residence located at 49 - 51 Bosworth Street, Richmond, City of Hawkesbury, New South Wales, Australia. It was built from 1827 to 1927. It was added to the New South Wales State Heritage Register on 2 April 1999.

History

Indigenous history
The lower Hawkesbury was home to the Dharug people. The proximity to the Nepean River and South Creek qualifies it as a key area for food resources for indigenous groups. The Dharug and Darkinjung people called the river Deerubbin and it was a vital source of food and transport.

Colonial history
Governor Arthur Phillip explored the local area in search of suitable agricultural land in 1789 and discovered and named the Hawkesbury River after Baron Hawkesbury. This region played a significant role in the early development of the colony with European settlers established here by 1794. Situated on fertile floodplains and well known for its abundant agriculture, Green Hills (as it was originally called) supported the colony through desperate times. However, frequent flooding meant that the farmers along the riverbanks were often ruined.

Governor Lachlan Macquarie replaced Governor Bligh, taking up duty on 1 January 1810. Under his influence the colony prospered. His vision was for a free community, working in conjunction with the penal colony. He implemented an unrivalled public works program, completing 265 public buildings, establishing new public amenities and improving existing services such as roads. Under his leadership Hawkesbury district thrived. He visited the district on his first tour and recorded in his journal on 6 December 1810: "After dinner I chrestened the new townships...I gave the name of Windsor to the town intended to be erected in the district of the Green Hills...the township in the Richmond district I have named Richmond..." the district reminded Macquarie of those towns in England, whilst Castlereagh, Pitt Town and Wilberforce were named after English statesmen. These are often referred to as Macquarie's Five Towns. Their localities, chiefly Windsor and Richmond, became more permanent with streets, town square and public buildings.

49-51 Bosworth Street
The earliest plan layout of this building conforms to Governor Macquarie's criteria for early housing in the Macquarie Towns (above the level of, and because of, the Hawkesbury River's irregular floods).

The building was built in a number of stages. The date of initial construction is unknown. Initially a four-room structure with a front verandah, it was expanded in the 1830s to include an additional three rooms to the south and a rear kitchen.

It was licensed as the "New Inn" under Robert Potts from 1837 until 1839. It later operated as a store and private residence.

It was saved from demolition in the 1980s, and incorporated into a motel development, the "New Inn Motel" in 1995. It now serves as a manager's residence for the motel at the rear of the property.

Description 
Early nineteenth century building now used as motel manager's residence;

Heritage listing 
49-51 Bosworth Street is an intact example of the more substantial town buildings erected in Richmond during the prosperous 1830s. It represents the style of building construction more substantial than the crude dwellings initially erected in the town. It has a strong association with a local entrepreneur, Isaac Cornwell, who was representative of the moderately successful second generation, native born colonist.

It demonstrates the characteristic style of town buildings, construction techniques and building materials of house building in the 1830s-1840s.

It is an example of utilising brick nog construction techniques of which only a small number (of known examples) remain today.

It offers a valuable and meaningful comparison to Bowman's Cottage demonstrating both the evolution and continuation of building styles, techniques and materials.

The site of the houses may possess archaeological potential.

New Inn was listed on the New South Wales State Heritage Register on 2 April 1999.

See also 

Pubs in Australia

References

Bibliography

Attribution 

New South Wales State Heritage Register
Richmond, New South Wales
Houses in Sydney
Pubs in New South Wales
Articles incorporating text from the New South Wales State Heritage Register